The Sand River is a  tributary of Lake Superior on the Upper Peninsula of Michigan in the United States. For most of its course it flows through Escanaba River State Forest in the northeastern corner of Marquette County, then enters the northwestern corner of Alger County just before flowing into Lake Superior at the village of Sand River.

See also
List of rivers of Michigan

References

Michigan  Streamflow Data from the USGS

Rivers of Michigan
Rivers of Marquette County, Michigan
Rivers of Alger County, Michigan
Tributaries of Lake Superior